Watson Township is one of fifteen townships in Effingham County, Illinois, USA.  As of the 2010 census, its population was 3,193 and it contained 1,263 housing units.

Geography

Cities, towns, villages
 Effingham (south edge)
 Watson (vast majority)

Unincorporated towns
 Heartville

Cemeteries
The township contains these five cemeteries: Immanuel Lutheran, Loy Chapel, Old Loy, Rinehart and Watson.

Major highways
  US Route 45

Airports and landing strips
 Effingham County Memorial Airport
 Percival Airport

Demographics

School districts
 Dieterich Community Unit School District 30
 Effingham Community Unit School District 40
 Teutopolis Community Unit School District 50

Political districts
 Illinois' 19th congressional district
 State House District 102
 State House District 108
 State Senate District 51
 State Senate District 54

References
 
 United States Census Bureau 2007 TIGER/Line Shapefiles
 United States National Atlas

External links
 City-Data.com
 Illinois State Archives

Townships in Effingham County, Illinois
1860 establishments in Illinois
Populated places established in 1860
Townships in Illinois